Group 3 is a rugby league competition on the north coast of New South Wales, run under the auspices of the Country Rugby League. The Group 3 area runs from Kempsey in the north to Forster in the south.

History
The league began in 1946, with Taree Old Bar winning the first ever premiership. At the time, this league was known as Group 18. In 1966, the boundaries were re-drawn to include three new clubs (Camden Haven, Port Macquarie, and Wauchope) and the group's name was changed to Group 3.

In 1995, Port Macquarie and Wauchope joined Group 2 in another re-zoning, with teams from Group 3 Saturday League joining the competition. In 2003, Port City RLFC joined the competition on loan from Group 2. In 2004, Wauchope re-joined the league after departing at the end of the 1994 season.

The current First Grade premiers are the Macleay Valley Mustangs.

The 2020 Group 3 competition was cancelled due to the COVID-19 pandemic in Australia. Junior competitions were postponed, eventually commencing in July. The highest age group competition winners were Wingham Tigers (Under 18 boys) and Port Macquarie Sharks (Under 17 Ladies League Tag).

Teams

The following clubs field teams in the Group 3 First Grade competition.

Junior Clubs
  Camden Haven Eagles (No Seniors)
  Forster Tuncurry Hawks
  Gloucester Magpies (Seniors play in Newcastle & Hunter Rugby League)
  Lake Cathie Raiders (Seniors play in Hastings League)
  Old Bar Beach Pirates
  Port City Breakers
  Port Macquarie Sharks
  Taree Red Rovers (feeder club to Taree City)
  Taree Panthers (feeder club to Taree City)
  Wauchope Blues
  Wingham Tigers

Former Teams
  Camden Haven Eagles (Withdrew from Senior Football)
  Cape Hawke
  Cundletown (Folded)
  Forster Dragons (Folded)
  Gloucester Magpies (Withdrew from first grade in 2002)
  Halliday Point Makos (Folded 2009)
  South Taree Rhinos (Folded)
  Taree Browns Creek (Folded)
  Taree Old Bar (Folded 1994)
  Taree United (Folded 1994)

Map

Premierships

First Grade
Separate teams in 1946, Forster and Tuncurry combined as Cape Hawke in 1947, then played as Foster-Tuncurry from 1953.

Group 3 

Source: Group 3 History
Grand Final scores compiled from results published in the Rugby League Week.

Leaderboard
Bold indicates active club
(Correct as of 28 September 2020)

Juniors

Forster Tuncurry Hawks

Macleay Valley Mustangs
Wayne Bartrim
Aiden Tolman

Old Bar Beach Pirates
Danny Buderus
Boyd Cordner
Ben Harris
Jarrod Mullen
Adam Woolnough

Port City Breakers
Daniel Dumas

Port Macquarie Sharks
Scott Dureau

Taree City Bulls

Matt Adamson
Phil Adamson
Latrell Mitchell
Michael Sullivan (rugby league)

Wauchope Blues
Mark Laurie (rugby league)
Robert Laurie (rugby league)
Ian Schubert
Rex Terp

Wingham Tigers
Michael Sullivan (rugby league)

See also

Rugby League Competitions in Australia

References

External links
 Group 3 on Country Rugby League's official site

Rugby league competitions in New South Wales
Mid North Coast